Can't Go Back may refer to:

 "Can't Go Back" (Sissel Kyrkjebø song), 2002
 "Can't Go Back" (Primal Scream song), 2008
 "Can't Go Back" (Fleetwood Mac song), 1983
 "Can't Go Back" (Infernal song), 2012
 Can't Go Back (album), a 2012 album by Tanita Tikaram
 "Can't Go Back", a song by Joe Satriani from his 2013 album Unstoppable Momentum